Kasterlee is a municipality located in the Belgian province of Antwerp. The municipality comprises the towns of Kasterlee proper, Lichtaart and Tielen. In 2021, Kasterlee had a total population of 19,052. The total area is 71.56 km2. The town is twinned with Plaffeien (Switzerland).

Notable people
 Baron Bob Stouthuysen (b. 10 March 1929), businessman.

Gallery

References

External links

 - Available only in Dutch

 
Municipalities of Antwerp Province
Populated places in Antwerp Province